Blue Lick may refer to:
Blue Lick, Indiana
Blue Lick, Kentucky
Blue Lick, Missouri

See also
Battle of Blue Licks